The 2021 Open Città di Bari was a professional tennis tournament played on hard courts. It was the first edition of the tournament which was part of the 2021 ATP Challenger Tour. It took place in Bari, Italy between 22 and 28 November 2021.

Singles main-draw entrants

Seeds

 1 Rankings are as of 15 November 2021.

Other entrants
The following players received wildcards into the singles main draw:
  Luca Nardi
  Oleksandr Ovcharenko
  Luca Potenza

The following player received entry into the singles main draw using a protected ranking:
  Filippo Baldi

The following players received entry from the qualifying draw:
  Fabrizio Andaloro
  Antoine Bellier
  Sebastian Fanselow
  Francesco Maestrelli

Champions

Singles

  Oscar Otte def.  Daniel Masur 7–5, 7–5.

Doubles

  Lloyd Glasspool /  Harri Heliövaara def.  Andrea Vavassori /  David Vega Hernández 6–3, 6–0.

References

Open Città di Bari
2021 in Italian tennis
November 2021 sports events in Italy